In molecular biology, Duffy binding proteins are found in Plasmodium. Plasmodium vivax and Plasmodium knowlesi merozoites invade Homo sapiens erythrocytes that express Duffy blood group surface determinants. The Duffy receptor family is localised in micronemes, an organelle found in all organisms of the phylum Apicomplexa.

The presence of duffy-binding-like domains defines the family of erythrocyte binding-like proteins (EBL), a family of cell invasion proteins universal among Plasmodium. These other members may use some other receptor, for example Glycophorin A. The other universal invasion protein is reticulocyte binding protein homologs. Both families are essential for cell invasion, as they function cooperatively.

A duffy-binding-like domain is also found in proteins of the family Plasmodium falciparum erythrocyte membrane protein 1.

See also
Genetic resistance to malaria

References

Protein families